Under the current Constitution of Cameroon, the Prime Minister of Cameroon is a relatively powerless position. While the Prime Minister is officially appointed to be the head of government, the President retains most of the executive power and can fire the Prime Minister at will.

The current prime minister, Joseph Ngute, was appointed by president Paul Biya. He took the office on 4 January 2019.

History
The position has existed in the eastern part of Cameroon since it gained its independence from France in 1960. When the western part gained independence from the British in 1961, the two halves of the Cameroon federation maintained their autonomy and each had a separate Prime Minister. In 1972, Cameroon became a unitary state and the position of Prime Minister was temporarily unfilled. In 1975, Paul Biya was appointed as Prime Minister for all of Cameroon. After Biya's succession to the Presidency, the post of Prime Minister did not exist from 1984 to 1991.

List of prime ministers of Cameroon, 1960–present

See also
Politics of Cameroon

References
 Constitution of the Republic of Cameroon (English and French versions). 18 January 1996. Accessed 8 August 2017.

External links
 Official Website

Politics of Cameroon
1960 establishments in Cameroon